The voiceless retroflex lateral flap is a type of consonantal sound, used in some spoken languages (as in Wahgi). It has no explicitly approved symbol in the International Phonetic Alphabet, but may be represented with a retroflex tail, as a short , or with the old dot diacritic, .

Features
Features of the voiceless retroflex lateral flap:

Occurrence
This phoneme is an allophone of /ɺ̥/ in the Wahgi language of Papua New Guinea.

References

Retroflex consonants

Pulmonic consonants

Lateral consonants
Tap and flap consonants
Oral consonants